Mapplewell is a village within the Metropolitan Borough of Barnsley, in South Yorkshire, England. Formerly part of the now defunct Barnsley West and Penistone borough constituency, following the Boundary Commission for England's report on South Yorkshire's Parliamentary constituencies in 2004 and the subsequent inquiry in 2005, it is now part of the Barnsley Central borough constituency. The village currently falls within the Barnsley MBC ward of Darton East.

History
Mapplewell began life as a hamlet within the Staincross Wapentake. As it grew in size it began to merge with neighbouring hamlet, Staincross and ever since the histories of the villages have been linked together. As in Staincross, nail making was an important industry in Mapplewell in the 17th century. However, by the late 19th century mining was the predominant source of employment, after the sinking of a deep mine in North Gawber. In 1761, John Wesley preached in Mapplewell, at a time when villagers had to go west to worship at the church in neighbouring Darton. After Wesley's visit, many chapels were built in the village, of which only a few remain.

Geography

Education
Mapplewell Primary School is in the village and was rated "Outstanding" by Ofsted in 2012.

Sport
The village was represented in the FA Cup by Mapplewell and Staincross Athletic F.C.

References

External links

Mapplewell.com 
Mapplewell Mavericks JFC

Villages in South Yorkshire
Geography of the Metropolitan Borough of Barnsley